Una is one of the 182 Legislative Assembly constituencies of Gujarat state in India. It is part of Gir Somnath district.

List of segments
This assembly seat represents the following segments,

 Una Taluka All Villages Amodra Kansariya, Jamvala, Bhakha, Thordi, Babariya, Sanvav, Jaragli, Ankolali, Panderi, Dhrabavad, Velakot, Jhanjhariya, Sonpura, Bhiyal, Bodidar, Kaneri, Maghardi, Ambavad, Kanakiya, Simasi, Ranvasi, Bhebha, Madhgam, Revad, Lerka, Chikhli, Sokhda, Kajardi, Kob, Bhingran, Tad

Members of Legislative Assembly

Election results

2022

2017

2012

See also
 List of constituencies of Gujarat Legislative Assembly
 Gujarat Legislative Assembly

References

External links
 

Assembly constituencies of Gujarat
Gir Somnath district